Toddy may refer to:

Places
 Toddy Bridge, a pedestrian bridge in Singapore
 Toddy Pond, a pond in Antarctica
 Todmorden, a town in Yorkshire, England, informally called Toddy

People
 Ralph "Toddy" Giannini (1917–1996), American basketball player
 Toddy Orlygsson (born 1966), Icelandic football player and manager
 Toddy O'Sullivan (born 1934), Irish politician
 Toddy Puller (born 1945), American politician
 Master Toddy (born 1953), Thai-American martial artist and trainer
 Svetoslav Todorov (born 1978), Bulgarian footballer
 Toddy Walters (born 1969), actress and singer/songwriter

Drinks
 Toddy (PepsiCo), a powdered milk drink now marketed mainly in South America
 Egg toddy, another name for eggnog
 Hot toddy, a mixed drink served hot
 Palm toddy or palm wine, an alcoholic beverage
 Toddy palm, several species of palms used to produce palm toddy
 Toddy shop, a drinking establishment where palm toddy is served
 Toddy coffee, a cold water coffee brewing system

Other uses
 Toddy, a nickname for a toddler
 Toddy cat, an Asian palm civet

See also
 Toady
 Todd (disambiguation)
 Tody

English masculine given names